The 2016–17 season was Notts County's 154th season in their history and their second consecutive season in League Two. Along with League Two, the club will also compete in the FA Cup, League Cup and League Trophy. The season covers the period from 1 July 2016 to 30 June 2017.

First-Team Squad

Statistics

|-
|colspan=14|Player(s) who left the club:

|-
|colspan=14|Player(s) who returned to their parent club:

|}

Goals record

Disciplinary Record

Contracts

Transfers

Transfers in

Transfers out

Loans in

Loans out

Competitions

Pre-season friendlies

League Two

League table

Results by matchday

Matches

FA Cup

EFL Cup

EFL Trophy

References

Notts County
Notts County F.C. seasons